Harry Katsiabanis is an Australian entrepreneur and public transport operator known for founding P2P Transport, TaxiLink, CABiT, Ride247, and the Huntingdale-based self storage company StorageX.

Early life and education 
Harry Katsiabanis attended Melbourne High School and La Trobe University. He worked as a real estate agent for a decade before deciding to enter the taxicab industry. He began driving taxi cabs in 1988, and bought his first taxi license at the age of 21. Katsiabanis attended Swinburne University of Technology from 2011 to 2013, and graduated with a master's degree.

Career

TaxiLink, TaxiEpay, Greek immigration 
Katsiabanis founded the Melbourne-based taxi network Taxi Link in 2003 and is the company's executive director. e also created TaxiEpay, an EFTPOS system, that same year. Katsiabanis is the spokesperson for Taxi Industry Stakeholders Victoria, and became known for opposing Allan Fels' position in the 2011 Taxi Industry Inquiry, and protesting government plans to reduce the value of taxi licenses.

In 2012, Katsiabanis started an initiative to encourage Greeks to immigrate to Australia and work as taxi drivers in the Melbourne-area during the Greek financial crisis. The initiative was motivated by changes in Australian immigration laws which reduced immigration from India, thereby creating a shortage of taxi cab drivers in Australia. That same year, Katsiabanis founded the Australian Taxi Academy, offering free training and seminars to Greeks who enrolled in the program. In June 2012, Katsiabanis he a series of seminars about the initiative in Athens.

In May 2013, it was reported Katsiabanis and two other taxi operators bought the rights to Taxiplon, a Greek taxi-booking app.

In November 2013, Katsiabanis announced his plans to launch Taxi Link Pink, a pink fleet of cabs driven by women for female passengers. He stated that the initiative was inspired by an article in The Age, which reported on sexual harassment by cab drivers in Victoria.

CABiT 
In 2014, Katsiabanis founded CABiT, an Australian vehicle for hire service that combined the fleets of Taxi Link, Ambassador, Cabways, and Kensington Taxis. Katsiabanis has stated that the company was modelled after the Indonesian taxi group Blue Bird. On August 24, 2015, CABiT launched a fleet of green-painted, hybrid cars.

P2P, Ride247 
Katsiabanis co-founded P2P Transport, a vehicle rental company, in 2017. He initially raised $30 million in funding for the company with a group of investors in mid-2017, and the company opened on the Australian Securities Exchange in December.

In 2018, Katsiabanis announced plans to launch Ride247, a mobile phone app which would allow users to book taxis, rideshare cars, and limousines.

StorageX 
Katsiabanis is currently the director of StorageX, an Australian self storage company based in Huntingdale, Victoria, which he founded in 2022 with his family.

Personal life 
Harry Katsiabanis is a Australian of Greek descent.

References 

21st-century Australian businesspeople
Australian people of Greek descent
Businesspeople from Melbourne
La Trobe University alumni
People educated at Melbourne High School
Swinburne University of Technology alumni
Australian businesspeople in transport
Year of birth missing (living people)
Living people